Hua Chiao Commercial Bank was a bank in Hong Kong. It was established in Hong Kong in 1962 by several Indonesian Chinese. After 1965, it became a member of Bank of China Group. It was involved in remittance and deposit account businesses, but it switched to export and import trading loan, international settlement after the 1970s. In 2001, it was merged to form Bank of China (Hong Kong).

References

Banks established in 1962
Banks disestablished in 2001
Defunct banks of Hong Kong
Bank of China
1962 establishments in Hong Kong
2001 disestablishments in Hong Kong